Matthias Norberg (1747–1826) was a Swedish professor of Greek and Oriental languages at Lund University.

Life 
He was born in 1747 in Nätra, Ångermanland in northern Sweden.

Matthias Norberg belonged to a very wealthy northern farming family descended from his grandfather Mats Isaksson in Norrtjärn in Nätra parish in Ångermanland. Matthias Norberg's father Matthias Matsson Norberg (1694–1764) was the crown sheriff and director of the linen industry in the North.

He died on 11 January 1826 in Uppsala, Sweden.

Career 
Norberg became a student in Uppsala University in 1768, receiving his Master of Arts in 1773 and became an associate professor of the Greek language in 1774. In 1777 he undertook, with royal support, a trip through Denmark, Germany, Netherlands, England, France and Italy.

It was in Paris he encountered the Mandaean religion record books, as well as several Syriac manuscripts. This stoked his interest in oriental studies.

In 1780, he was appointed a professor of Oriental languages and Greek at Lund University.

Norberg was elected in 1821 as a member of the Royal Swedish Academy of Sciences.

References

External links 

1747 births
1826 deaths
Swedish orientalists
People from Ångermanland
Uppsala University alumni
Academic staff of Uppsala University
Academic staff of Lund University
Members of the Royal Swedish Academy of Sciences
Burials at Uppsala old cemetery
Scholars of Mandaeism
Translators from Mandaic